Jaroslav Škarvan (3 April 1944 – 21 June 2022) was a Czechoslovak handball player who competed in the 1972 Summer Olympics.

He was part of the Czechoslovak team which won the silver medal at the Munich Games. He played three matches as goalkeeper.

References

External links
 Profile at Sports-Reference.com

1944 births
2022 deaths
Czech male handball players
Czechoslovak male handball players
Olympic handball players of Czechoslovakia
Handball players at the 1972 Summer Olympics
Olympic silver medalists for Czechoslovakia
Olympic medalists in handball
Medalists at the 1972 Summer Olympics
Sportspeople from Plzeň